Kieran Duff (born 14 February 1961) is an Irish former Gaelic footballer. His league and championship career at senior level playing for the Dublin county team spanned thirteen seasons from 1979 to 1992.

Born in Dublin, Duff first played competitive Gaelic football during his schooling. He later joined the Fingallians club and won a county junior championship medal in 1993.

Duff made his debut on the inter-county scene at the age of seventeen when he was picked on the Dublin minor team. He won a Leinster medal in this grade in 1979. Duff later joined the Dublin under-21 team, winning a Leinster medal in 1980. By this stage he had joined the Dublin senior team, making his debut during the 1979-80 league. Over the course of the next thirteen seasons Duff won one All-Ireland medal in 1983. He also won four Leinster medals, two National Football League medals and two All-Stars. He retired from inter-county football during the 1991-92 league.

Duff also played association football for Swords Celtic and Shelbourne, making his League of Ireland debut as a substitute on 8 December 1985.

In retirement from playing Duff became involved in team management and coaching. He was a selector with the Dublin senior team under Paul Caffrey.

Honours

Team
 Fingallians
 Dublin Junior Football Championship (1): 1993

 Dublin
 All-Ireland Senior Football Championship (1): 1983
 Leinster Senior Football Championship (4): 1983, 1984, 1985, 1989
 National Football League (2): 1986-87, 1990-91

Individual
 Awards
 All-Stars Awards (2): 1987, 1988

References

1961 births
Living people
Dublin inter-county Gaelic footballers
Fingallians Gaelic footballers
Gaelic footballers who switched code
League of Ireland players
Shelbourne F.C. players
Sportspeople from Fingal
Winners of one All-Ireland medal (Gaelic football)
Association footballers not categorized by position
Republic of Ireland association footballers